The National Taiwan University Archives is located at the NTU Shuiyuan Campus in Daan District, Taipei, Taiwan.

History
The archive was established in August 2007 after it was relocated to the Shuiyuan Campus of NTU.

Themes
The archives includes the following themes:

 Establishment
 Continuation
 Revolution
 Seal
 Chartulary
 Epitome

Transportation
The archives is accessible within walking distance west from Gongguan Station of the Taipei Metro.

See also
 List of museums in Taiwan
 National Taiwan University

References

Museums established in 2007
Museum of Archives
History museums in Taiwan
University museums in Taiwan
Museum of Archives
Museums in Taipei
Museum of Archives